Reussia may refer to:
 Reussia (bryozoan), a genus of bryozoans in the family Bryocryptellidae
 Reussia, a genus of plants in the family Rubiaceae, synonym of Paederia
 Reussia, a genus of protists (foraminifers) in the family Reussellidae, synonym of Reussella